Katharina Maria Mangold-Wirz, née Wirz, (born Basel 23 May 1922 - died Basel 22 November 2003) was a Swiss marine biologist and malacologist, who worked at Université Pierre et Marie Curie's Laboratoire Arago in Banyuls-sur-Mer, France.

Mangold-Wirz was born in Basel on 23 May 1922 to Eduard Wirz (1891–1970), a teacher, historian and writer, and Clara Wirz-Burgin. She graduated from high school in Basel in 1940 and went to Basel University to study medicine with the ambition of being a brain surgeon. However, she was discouraged from pursuing this ambition by specialists in Switzerland as she was "too short, female and appeared frail!" She switched to studying zoology from 1943 to 1948, achieving a D.Phil. with her thesis on non-human brains, with Adolf Portmann, as her supervisor being published in 1950 in Acta Anatomica. She was awarded a 3-year scholarship at the Janggen-Pöhn Foundation of St Gallen to carry out research on Opisthobranchs from 1950 in Villefranche-sur-Mer and Banyuls-sur-Mer. In 1951 she was appointed as a researcher at the Centre National de la Recherché Scientifique and her focus from then was on the biology of cephalopods. Portmann acted as her mentor until he died in 1982.

In 1958 she married Walter Mangold and in 1961 she was awarded the Doctorat ès Sciences (Doctorat d'état) from the University of Paris with her thesis being published in Vie et Meileu. In that year she was also promoted to Research Fellow at the Centre National de la Recherché Scientifique and in 1966 she was appointed as a Senior Researcher. In 1969 overseas recognition came with her appointment as a visiting Research Professor at the Memorial University of Newfoundland. Further recognition came in 1983 when she was elected as the first president of the Cephalopod International Advisory Council at their meeting in Banyuls-sur-Mer. She retired from academia in 1987 but she continued as an active scientist. In 1989 she was the co-author of the cephalopod volume of the textbook with Grassé, Traité du Zoologie and in 1993 she was appointed an honorary life member of the Cephalopod International Advisory Council. She died in Basel on 22 November 2003.

The octopus Microeledone mangoldi and the squid Asperoteuthis mangoldae are named in her honour.

References

Teuthologists
20th-century Swiss zoologists
Swiss malacologists
1922 births
2003 deaths
Women zoologists
Swiss expatriates in France
20th-century Swiss women scientists